Belciugatele is a commune in Călărași County, Muntenia, Romania. It is composed of five villages: Belciugatele, Cândeasca, Cojești, Mataraua and Măriuța.

As of 2007 the population of Belciugatele is 1,878.

The ruins of a Dacian fortress are located in Mataraua.

References

Belciugatele
Localities in Muntenia